Leonard Esau (born March 16, 1968) is a Canadian former ice hockey defenceman who played 27 games in the National Hockey League for the Toronto Maple Leafs, Quebec Nordiques, Calgary Flames and the Edmonton Oilers between 1991 and 1995. The Leafs drafted him in the fifth round 86th overall in the 1988 NHL Entry Draft from the St. Cloud State Huskies. Esau never scored a goal in the NHL, but notched up 10 assists and collected 24 penalty minutes. He spent much of his tenure in the American Hockey League and the International Hockey League, but also spent one season in Japan, playing for Seibu-Tetsudo Tokyo. Internationally Esau played for the Canadian national team at the 1995 World Championships, winning a bronze medal.

Career statistics

Regular season and playoffs

International

External links
 

1968 births
Living people
Calgary Flames players
Canadian ice hockey defencemen
Cincinnati Cyclones (IHL) players
Detroit Vipers players
Edmonton Oilers players
Halifax Citadels players
Ice hockey people from Saskatchewan
Indianapolis Ice players
Japan Ice Hockey League players
Milwaukee Admirals (IHL) players
Newmarket Saints players
Quebec Nordiques players
Saint John Flames
St. John's Maple Leafs players
Sportspeople from Meadow Lake, Saskatchewan
Toronto Maple Leafs draft picks
Toronto Maple Leafs players